Eislingen is a town in the district of Göppingen in Baden-Württemberg, Germany.

History
Southern Eislingen (Kleineislingen) became a possession Württemberg in 1492 while Northern Eislingen (Großeislingen) was annexed by the Prince-Bishopric of Würzburg. The period of municipal division brought about strife between local Imperial Knights (Reichsritter) until the dissolution of the Holy Roman Empire in 1803. The events of Protestant Reformation in Germany brought another third of Eislingen under the sovereignty of the Duchy of Württemberg and joint control with Würzburg with the rest of the city. In 1802, Würzburg was annexed by the Electorate of Bavaria. This, by extension, made Northern Eislingen a Bavarian possession until it was ceded in 1806 to the now Kingdom of Württemberg. Northern and Southern Eislingen united into a single city, named Eislingen-Fils, in 1933. The town of Krummwälden was incorporated into Eislingen in 1935. The construction of the Fils Valley Railway through Eislingen in 1845 began a period of industrialization and population expansion that continued after World War II and would make Eislingen the most densely populated municipality in Göppingen's jurisdiction. Eislingen was declared a major town, or Große Kreisstadt, in 2012.

Geography
The city (Stadt) of Eislingen is located in the north of the district of Göppingen, in the German state of Baden-Württemberg. Elevation above sea level in the municipal area ranges from a high of  Normalnull (NN), in the northeast, to a low of  NN on the Fils.

Politics
Eislingen has one borough (Stadtteile), Eislingen-Fils, and five villages: Eschenbäche, Etzberg, Krummwälden, Stumpenhof, and Täleshof. There are three abandoned villages in the municipal area: Brunnenweiler, Ehrenstetten, and Hammertweil.

Coat of arms
Eislingen's coat of arms is divided party per cross into four sections, two white and two blue. In the upper half of the blazon is a  that alternates between white and blue as it crosses into different fields. This pattern was the coat of arms of Northern Eislingen and it was re-adopted by the city of Eislingen when it merged with Southern Eislingen in 1933. The blue-white tincture is a reference to the Prince-Bishopric of Würzburg, and the stag antler to Württemberg. The stag antler was black until 1955.

Partner cities
  Villány, Hungary, since April 1989
  Oyonnax, France, since 17 December 2001

Transportation
Eislingen is connected to Germany's network of roadways by Bundesstraße 10, specifically a four-lane extension of the highway that was completed in 2006. The city is also connected to Germany's system of railroads by the Fils Valley Railway.

References 

Towns in Baden-Württemberg
Göppingen (district)